Gevilipitiya Town Grama Niladhari Division is a Grama Niladhari Division of the Aranayaka Divisional Secretariat  of Kegalle District  of Sabaragamuwa Province, Sri Lanka .  It has Grama Niladhari Division Code 45B.

Gevilipitiya Town is a surrounded by the Dippitiya, Gevilipitiya Gama, Moragammana, Narangammana and Vilpola  Grama Niladhari Divisions.

Demographics

Ethnicity 

The Gevilipitiya Town Grama Niladhari Division has a Sinhalese majority (94.2%) . In comparison, the Aranayaka Divisional Secretariat (which contains the Gevilipitiya Town Grama Niladhari Division) has a Sinhalese majority (90.1%)

Religion 

The Gevilipitiya Town Grama Niladhari Division has a Buddhist majority (94.2%) . In comparison, the Aranayaka Divisional Secretariat (which contains the Gevilipitiya Town Grama Niladhari Division) has a Buddhist majority (90.0%)

Grama Niladhari Divisions of Aranayaka Divisional Secretariat

References